Sara García Alonso (born 1989) is a Spanish cancer researcher and reserve astronaut. Since 2019, she has been a postdoctoral researcher at the Spanish National Cancer Research Centre.  In 2022, she was chosen as a reserve astronaut in the European Astronaut Corps.

Education and academic career 
García attended University of León, where she earned a bachelor's degree in biotechnology in 2012 and a master's degree in biomedical and biological research in 2013.

As a doctoral candidate at University of Salamanca, García conducted research on cancer medicine as a university research assistant for the Spanish National Research Council. She earned a doctorate cum laude in the nuclear biology of cancer and translational medicine in the university's  in 2018, advised by Atanasio Pandiella Alonso. Her doctoral dissertation focused on mechanisms of resistance to antibody-drug conjugates in ErbB receptors and it won her the university's Outstanding Doctorate Award the following year.

Since 2019, she has been working as a postdoctoral researcher on drug discovery and experimental oncology at the Spanish National Cancer Research Centre, where she has led a project to discover drugs for lung cancer and pancreatic cancer in the laboratory of Mariano Barbacid. Her research has focused on RAF1 selective degraders as a therapeutic target, in order to combat certain forms of cancers. She participated in a 6-month training programme at IE Business School, in Madrid, in 2021.

Astronaut career 
The European Space Agency (ESA) selected García as a reserve astronaut for the 2022 selection of astronauts of the European Astronaut Corps. García and fellow astronaut candidate , both natives of León, Spain, are the first Spaniards selected by the ESA since Pedro Duque joined the European Astronaut Corps in 1992. They were selected from more than 22,500 candidates across Europe. As a reserve astronaut, García will continue her current job, and will begin training if found to be an ideal candidate for a future space mission.

Personal life 
García was born in León, Spain, in 1989. In addition to her biomedical research, she has worked as a personal trainer and a nutrition coach.

Notes

References 

Living people
1989 births
21st-century Spanish scientists
21st-century Spanish women
21st-century Spanish women scientists
People from León, Spain
Cancer researchers
Spanish biologists
Molecular biologists
Spanish astronauts
Women astronauts
University of Salamanca alumni
European Space Agency personnel
Spanish women academics
Women molecular biologists